Selmer W. Gunderson (February 25, 1890 – 1972) was a member of the Wisconsin State Assembly.

Biography
Gunderson was born on February 25, 1890, in Colfax, Wisconsin. He attended Colfax High School. From 1910 to 1918, he worked for the Soo Line Railroad.

Political career
Gunderson was first elected to the Assembly in 1940. Previously, he served as a messenger in the Assembly. He was a Republican.

References

External links

People from Colfax, Wisconsin
Employees of the Wisconsin Legislature
Republican Party members of the Wisconsin State Assembly
American Lutherans
1890 births
1972 deaths
20th-century American politicians
20th-century Lutherans